is the fifth single by Japanese singer/songwriter Chisato Moritaka. The lyrics were written by Chisato Moritaka, the music was composed and arranged by Shinji Yasuda. The single was released by Warner Pioneer on October 25, 1988.

Music video 
The music video features Moritaka walking on her way home after work. During her commute, she rents a VHS copy of Aitsu ni Koishite (which she also starred in) and buys a bento meal. Upon arriving in her apartment, she has her dinner and watches the movie before looking at a ring in a jar, which is presumably an engagement ring from a former boyfriend.

Chart performance 
"Alone" peaked at No. 25 on Oricon's singles chart and sold 26,000 copies.

Other versions 
"Alone" was remixed for the 1989 greatest hits album Moritaka Land.

Moritaka re-recorded the song and uploaded the video on her YouTube channel on December 19, 2014. This version is also included in Moritaka's 2015 self-covers DVD album Love Vol. 8.

Track listing

Personnel 
 Chisato Moritaka – vocals
 Naoki Suzuki – synthesizer programming
 Shinji Yasuda – backing vocals

Chart positions

References

External links 
 
 
 

1988 singles
1988 songs
Japanese-language songs
Chisato Moritaka songs
Songs with lyrics by Chisato Moritaka
Warner Music Japan singles